The Rawandiz massacre was committed by the Russian Empire, and their allied Assyrian volunteers. It targeted the Kurdish Muslims from Rawandiz during May 1916. An estimated 8,000 Kurds were killed, which was 80% of the city, and the entire city was destroyed and looted.

Massacre 
While World War I as going on in 1915, the Russians, with help from Assyrians, invaded the city of Rawandiz. The Russians and their Assyrian allies massacred 80% of the Kurdish Muslim population of the city; after the town fell, only 20 percent of the Kurdish Muslim population managed to survive. Not all of the Kurds from Rawandiz were shot, some were thrown into the famous Rawandiz gorge. Many Kurdish women also jumped to their deaths just to avoid being raped by the soldiers. The Russian-Assyrian soldiers were unable to take Mount Korek, and after two to three months they were forced to withdraw due to the heavy Kurdish resistance.

References

Persecution of Muslims by Christians
Massacres of Kurds
ku:Komkujiya Rewandizê
ckb:کۆمەڵکوژیی ڕەواندز